Jean Philip (4 October 1912 – 22 January 1983) was a French racing cyclist. He rode in the 1935 Tour de France.

References

1912 births
1983 deaths
French male cyclists
Place of birth missing